The men's 400 metres hurdles event at the 2004 African Championships in Athletics was held in Brazzaville, Republic of the Congo on July 17–18.

Medalists

Results

Heats

Final

References
Results

2004 African Championships in Athletics
400 metres hurdles at the African Championships in Athletics